Kavya (disambiguation) may refer to:
 Kāvya, a Sanskrit literary style.
 Kavya (film), a 1995 Indian film
 Kaavya Arivumani, Tamil television actress
 Kavya Madhavan, Malayalam film actress
 Kaavya Viswanathan, author known for her plagiarism scandal
 Kavya Shetty, Indian film actress and model
 Kavya Ajit, singer from Kerala
 Kavya Bharati, an annual literary journal